The Constitution of Kuwait was created by the Constitutional Assembly in 1961–1962 and signed into law on 11 November 1962 by the Emir, the Commander of the Military of Kuwait Sheikh Abdullah III Al-Salim Al-Sabah.

History
In June 1961, following the independence of Kuwait and under the shadow of an Iraqi threat, Amir Abdullah Al-Salim Al-Sabah announced that he would establish a constitution for Kuwait. In December, elections were held for a Constituent Assembly, which then drafted a constitution promulgated as Law Number 1 on November 11, 1962. Although articles of the constitution have since been suspended twice, the document nonetheless remains the basic statement of intent for the Kuwaiti political system.

Timeline of the 1962 Kuwaiti constitution 
Sources:

 19 June 1961: Independence
 21 June 1961: Kuwait applies for membership in the Arab League
 25 June 1961: Qasim claims Kuwait for Iraq
 30 June 1961: Kuwait requests admission to the United Nations
 1 July 1961: British troops land in Kuwait
 4 July 1961: Arab League debates whether the admission of new states (such as Kuwait) requires unanimity of member states or a simple majority 
 7 July 1961: Soviet Union vetoes a British Security Council resolution to "respect" Kuwaiti independence
 10-26 July 1961: 
 A delegation of prominent Kuwaitis visits Egypt; Nasser agrees to assemble an Arab force to replace British troops
 The delegation also visits Saudi Arabia, Sudan, Libya, Tunisia, Morocco, Jordan, and Lebanon
 20 July 1961: Kuwait admitted to the Arab League, the Iraqi delegation walks out of the meeting in protest
 21 July 1961: The Arab League makes preparations to send Arab troops to Kuwait
 26 August 1961: Kuwait emir Sheikh Abdulla Al-Salim Al-Sabah appoints a committee to write a law on elections to the Constitutional Convention
 6 September 1961: Law on elections issued
 10 September 1961: Arab forces begin to arrive in Kuwait under the auspices of the Arab League; forces are from Saudi Arabia, the United Arab Republic, Jordan, Sudan, and Tunisia
 10 October 1961: British forces complete withdrawal from Kuwait
 30 November 1961: Kuwait applies again for United Nations membership, and the Soviet Union vetoes the application again
 30 December 1961: Elections held to the Constitutional Convention
 20 January 1962: Opening session of the Constitutional Convention
 27 March 1962: Jasim Al-Qatami, a prominent Arab nationalist, appointed deputy minister of foreign affairs
 11 November 1962: 1962 constitution issued
 23 January 1963: Elections held to the first National Assembly
 9 February 1963: Qasim overthrown and killed
 14 May 1963: Kuwait admitted to the United Nations
 4 October 1963: Iraqi government formally recognizes Kuwait
 12 October 1963: Kuwait provides a loan of 30 million British pounds to the Iraqi Government

Overview and organization of government
The Constitution of the State of Kuwait is composed of 183 articles divided into five chapters:
The State and the System of Government
Fundamental Constituents of Kuwaiti Society
Public Rights and Duties
Powers
General and Transitional Provisions
The constitution defines Kuwait as "a hereditary Emirate, the succession to which shall be in the descendants of the late Mubarak Al Sabah." This clause codifies what has become practice: the semiformal alternation of power since 1915 between the lines of Mubarak's two ruling sons: Jabir and Salim.

The Constitution of Kuwait is theoretically based on the modern civil state democratic principles and combines aspects of both presidential and parliamentary systems (theoretically). The pillars of the Constitution are the sovereignty of the State, public freedom and equality before the law. Although granting the emir very substantial power, the constitution also provides for some semblance of political participation by the citizens. The system of government is defined in Article 6 as "democratic, under which sovereignty resides in the people, the source of all powers." Articles 79 to 122 establish the National Assembly and lay out the rules governing its formation, rights, and duties.

The head of the state is the Emir, the Commander of the Military of Kuwait, who has extensive competencies, who along with his cabinet constitutes the executive branch. The Emir is also part of the legislative branch along with the  National Assembly of Kuwait. The parliament can be dismissed by the Emir, which is usually followed by elections within 2 months. The constitution opens with the declaration that Kuwait is "an independent sovereign Arab State," and its people are "a part of the Arab Nation." Islam is "the religion of the state," and the sharia (Islamic law) is "a main source of legislation." The latter phrase has been the source of much debate, with Islamist opposition members pressing to have Islam made "the" source of legislation.

Individual and social rights and duties
Individual rights protected by the constitution are extensive and include personal liberty and equality before the law, freedom to hold beliefs and express opinions, and freedom of the press. The residences of citizens are inviolable, the torture and the deportation of Kuwaiti citizens are prohibited, and the accused are assumed innocent until proven guilty. Also guaranteed is the freedom to form associations and trade unions. The constitution guarantees the independence of the judiciary and designates the Supreme Council of the Judiciary as its highest body and guarantor of judicial independence.

The constitution also grants citizens a number of social rights, which form the basis for Kuwait's extensive welfare system. The state is constitutionally obligated to care for the young and to aid the old, the ill, and the disabled. It is obliged to provide public education and to attend to public health. The constitution provides for state involvement in the national economy to the degree that these obligations necessitate. 

However, Articles 16 through 19 protect private property, stating that "private property is inviolable" and reminding citizens that "inheritance is a right governed by the Islamic Sharia." Article 20 stipulates that "the national economy shall be based on social justice. It is founded on fair cooperation between public and private activities. Its aim shall be economic development, increase of productivity, improvement of the standard of living and achievement of prosperity for citizens, all within the limits of the law." Duties of citizens include national defense, observance of public order and respect for public morals, and payment of taxes. 

These rights and obligations, however, apply only to Kuwaiti citizens. The remainder of the population have few political and civil rights and enjoy restricted access to the benefits of the state welfare system.

Suspension of the constitution in 1976 and 1986
The Kuwaiti constitution has been suspended twice: in 1976 and 1986.

In August 1976, in reaction to heightened assembly opposition to his policies, the emir suspended four articles of the constitution concerned with political and civil rights (freedom of the press and dissolution of the legislature) and the assembly itself. In 1980, however, the suspended articles of the constitution were reinstated along with the National Assembly. 

In 1982 the government submitted sixteen constitutional amendments that, among other things, would have allowed the emir to declare martial law for an extended period and would have increased both the size of the legislature and the length of terms of office. In May 1983, the proposals were formally dropped after several months of debate. Nonetheless, the issue of constitutional revisions continued as a topic of discussion in both the National Assembly and the palace. 

In 1986 the constitution was again suspended, along with the National Assembly. As with the previous suspension, popular opposition to this move emerged; indeed, the prodemocracy movement of 1989-90 took its name, the Constitutional Movement, from the demand for a return to constitutional life. This opposition became more pronounced following the Iraqi occupation, which abrogated all constitutional rights, and following Kuwait's return to sovereignty in 1991. 

In early 1992, many press restrictions were lifted. After the October 1992 election, the National Assembly exercised its constitutional right to review all emiri decrees promulgated while the assembly was in dissolution.

References

External links 
Constitution of Kuwait (Arabic)

Politics of Kuwait
Kuwait